Bill Camp (born 1963/1964) is an American actor. He has played supporting roles in many films such as Lincoln (2012), Compliance (2012), 12 Years a Slave (2013), Love & Mercy (2015), Loving (2016), Molly's Game (2017), Vice (2018), Wildlife (2018), Joker (2019), and News of the World (2021); the HBO miniseries The Night Of in 2016 and The Outsider in 2020; and the Netflix miniseries The Queen's Gambit in 2020. He had a recurring role in the HBO drama series The Leftovers from 2015 to 2017 and the Hulu space drama series The First in 2018.

Camp has appeared in many television series and received a Primetime Emmy Award nomination for his role in the miniseries The Night Of (2016). He was nominated for a Tony Award for his role in the 2016 Broadway revival of the play The Crucible.

Early life
Camp was born and raised in Massachusetts, and is the son of Patricia L., a librarian, and Peter B. Camp, who was an assistant headmaster at the Groton School. He attended the University of Vermont, where he played intramural hockey.

Career

Theatre 
Initially, Camp was largely active in theatre, but has taken on character roles in both film and television. In 2002, he left acting and temporarily changed professions (working as a cook and mechanic), only to return two years later in Tony Kushner's Homebody/Kabul, for which he won an Obie Award (Off-Broadway Theater Awards).

Among his works on Broadway are Heartbreak House (2006), Death of a Salesman (2012) and The Crucible (2016). In 2006, Camp joined Philip Bosco and Lily Rabe in the Broadway revival of Heartbreak House at the Roundabout Theatre Company's American Airlines Theatre.  In 2012, Camp joined Philip Seymour Hoffman and Andrew Garfield in Mike Nichols' Broadway revival of Death of a Salesman at the Ethel Barrymore Theatre. The show ran from March 15, 2012, through June 2, 2012 and earned rave reviews, and won the Tony Award for Best Revival of a Play.  In 2016, he starred in the Broadway revival of The Crucible alongside Saoirse Ronan, Ben Whishaw, Ciaran Hinds and Sophie Okenedo at the Walter Kerr Theatre. He received a Tony Award for Best Featured Actor in a Play nomination for The Crucible.

Off-Broadway credits include starring as Gordon in Sarah Ruhl's Dead Man's Cell Phone at Playwrights Horizons in 2008, before having to withdraw due to other work commitments.

Film 
Camp has been in a wide variety of films such as Lincoln (2012), 12 Years a Slave (2013), Love and Mercy (2015), Loving (2016), Molly's Game (2017), Woman Walks Ahead (2017), Vice (2018), Wildlife (2018), Dark Waters (2019), Joker (2019), and The Kitchen (2019).

On August 30, 2021, it was announced that Camp will appear as Matthew Burke in an adaptation of Stephen King's Salem's Lot for Warner Bros. Pictures and New Line Cinema.

Television 
In 2011, he appeared in the second season of the HBO TV series Boardwalk Empire as the hunter Glenmore. Camp has also appeared in Law & Order, The Good Wife, The Leftovers and The Night Of, receiving a Primetime Emmy Award nomination for The Night Of. In 2018, he played FBI agent Bob Chesney, in the critically acclaimed and Emmy-nominated miniseries The Looming Tower.  In 2020, Camp became narrator of Forensic Files II on HLN and played Mr. Shaibel in The Queen's Gambit.  Camp had a secondary but significant role in Jeff Daniels' TV miniseries,  American Rust, in 2021, on Showtime. His performance was widely praised by television critics. The script was an adaptation of Philipp Meyer's novel of the same title.

Personal life
He married actress Elizabeth Marvel on September 4, 2004. They have one son.

Acting credits

Awards and nominations

References

External links
 
 
 

1960s births
Living people
American male film actors
American male stage actors
American male television actors
21st-century American male actors
Obie Award recipients
Juilliard School alumni
University of Vermont alumni
Male actors from Massachusetts
People from Groton, Massachusetts